Chitonina is a suborder of polyplacophoran mollusc  belonging to the orfer Chitonida.

Superfamilies
The suborder includes both living and extinct species.
 Chitonoidea Rafinesque, 1815
 Schizochitonoidea Dall, 1889

References 

 Sirenko B.I. 1993. Revision of the system of the order Chitonida (Molluscs: Polyplacophora) on the basis of correlation between the type of gills arrangement and the shape of the chorion processes. Ruthenica 3: 93-117

Chitons
Prehistoric mollusc taxonomy
Mollusc suborders